Sven Viktor Rosendahl (7 April 1913 – 8 September 1990) was a Swedish journalist, novelist and short story writer. Among his books are the short story collection Svartstarr from 1949 and the novel Gud fader och tattaren from 1951. He was awarded the Dobloug Prize in 1984.

References

1913 births
1990 deaths
Swedish poets
Swedish essayists
Swedish translators
Dobloug Prize winners
20th-century translators
20th-century Swedish novelists
20th-century Swedish poets
Swedish male poets
Swedish male novelists
Male essayists
20th-century essayists
20th-century Swedish male writers